Starcastle is an American progressive rock band from Champaign, Illinois, United States. Formed in 1969, the group played many shows under the names Pegasus and Mad John Fever before eventually settling on Starcastle. They inked their first record deal with Epic Records in 1974, and received extensive airplay and frequently played in the St. Louis area. The original lineup included former REO Speedwagon vocalist Terry Luttrell and computing author/programmer Herb Schildt, while the mid-1980s lineup would briefly include guitarist Mark McGee, who went on to join Vicious Rumors. They released four albums on both the Epic and CBS labels. The band's debut album Starcastle sold well, garnering worldwide airplay.

Their later albums Fountains of Light, Citadel, and Real to Reel did not sell as well as the first and they were often criticized for sounding too musically similar to Yes. They were opening acts for such bands as Jethro Tull, Gentle Giant, Fleetwood Mac, Kansas, Boston, Rush, Journey, and others. After several line-up changes, the band went on a ten-year hiatus from 1987.

In 2002, Gary Strater, Steve Tassler and Steve Hagler all released solo albums on the band's own Sunsinger label. This led to work on the band's final album Song of Times, before Gary Strater's death on September 19, 2004, from pancreatic cancer. Song of Times was released in 2007.

In November 2018, the band's official website announced the release of Alchemy, an archive release of studio and live material from the band's 1980s line-up. Additionally, their website announced a new line-up of the band consisting of George Harp (vocals) and Bruce Botts (guitar), both of whom were in the 1980s line-up.

Players

Past
 Gary Strater – Bass, Moog Taurus, Backing Vocals (1969–1987, 1997–2004; died 2004)
 Matt Stewart – Guitar, Backing Vocals (1969–1981, 1997–2006)
 Steve Hagler – Guitar, Backing Vocals (1969–1980, 2006)
 Steve Tassler – Drums, Backing Vocals (1969–1980, 2006)
 Herb Schildt – Keyboards (1969–1978, 1997–2006)
 Terry Luttrell – Lead Vocals (1973–1978, 2006)
 Ralph Goldheim ("Caribou Ralph") – Lead Vocals, Keyboards (1979–1981)
 Bruce Botts – Guitar, Keyboards, Vocals (1982–2019)
 Scott McKenzie – Drums, Backing Vocals (1982–1987)
 Mark McGee – Guitar (1985–1986)
 George Harp - Lead Vocals (1982- 1986 - 2015-2019)

Timeline

Discography

References

External links
 
 
 

Musical groups from Champaign, Illinois
Progressive rock musical groups from Illinois